Milan Jovanić (born 31 July 1985) is a Serbian football manager and former player. He played as a goalkeeper for Vojvodina last, and then retired and became goalkeeping coach.

Club career
Jovanić began his career at hometown club FK Vojvodina before moving to FK Veternik. In 2005, he joined Australian A-League club Perth Glory. He made one league appearance for Perth Glory in their match against Sydney FC, and left the club after the 2005/2006 season. It kept a clean sheet, becoming the only regular goalkeeper to have played in the A-League and left without conceding a goal.

Jovanić returned to Serbia and signed with FK Novi Sad from Serbian League Vojvodina, where he took part of their promotion to the First League. After two seasons in the First League he moved to the Superliga side Spartak Subotica. Jovanić played 29 matches in 2009/2010 season, the club finished 4th in the league and qualified for the European cups. Jovanić finished second in voting for the Best Superliga Goalkeeper, after Saša Stamenković.

On 13 June 2010, Jovanić joined Polish Ekstraklasa side Wisła Kraków on a five-year deal for an undisclosed fee from Spartak Subotica. He won the Ekstraklasa championship in his debut season.

International career
Jovanić made his senior debut for Serbia in a friendly match against Japan  in Osaka where Serbia ran out 3-0 winners.

Honours

FK Novi Sad
Serbian League Vojvodina: 2006–07

Wisła Kraków
Ekstraklasa: 2010–11

References

External links

Milan Jovanić at reprezentacija.rs

1985 births
Living people
Footballers from Novi Sad
Serbian footballers
Serbia international footballers
Serbian expatriate footballers
FK Obilić players
Perth Glory FC players
A-League Men players
RFK Novi Sad 1921 players
FK Spartak Subotica players
Wisła Kraków players
Serbian SuperLiga players
Ekstraklasa players
Association football goalkeepers
Expatriate footballers in Poland
Serbian expatriate sportspeople in Poland
Serbian football managers